Michèle Victory (born 28 October 1958) is a French politician for the Socialist Party who served as member of the French National Assembly for Ardèche's 2nd constituency. She was first a substitute candidate in 2007 and became a member of the assembly in December 2017 after her predecessor Olivier Dussopt had joined the government as a Secretary of State in the Ministry of Public Action and Accounts. Victory is an English teacher by profession and became involved in local politics in 1995.

On 9 March 2020, during the COVID-19 pandemic, she tested positive for the virus.

References

1958 births
Living people
Deputies of the 15th National Assembly of the French Fifth Republic
Socialist Party (France) politicians
People from Annaba